Estádio Dr. Jayme Cintra, usually known as Estádio Jayme Cintra, is a multi-purpose stadium in Jundiaí, Brazil. It is currently used mostly for Paulista Futebol Clube football matches. The stadium has a maximum capacity of 15,000 people.

Estádio Jayme Cintra is owned by the Jundiaí City Hall. The stadium is named after a Companhia Paulista de Estradas de Ferro ("São Paulo Railroad Company") president.

History
In 1957, construction on Estádio Jayme Cintra was completed. The inaugural match was played on May 30 of that year, when Paulista beat Palmeiras 3–1. The first goal of the stadium was scored by Paulista's Belmiro.

The stadium's attendance record currently stands at 28,473, set on March 2, 1969, when Santos beat Paulista 2–1.

References

Enciclopédia do Futebol Brasileiro, Volume 2 - Lance, Rio de Janeiro: Aretê Editorial S/A, 2001.

External links
 Official site - Estádio Dr. Jayme Cintra

Jayme Cintra
Jayme Cintra
Jayme Cintra